The following is a list of awards and nominations received by Australian actor Kodi Smit-McPhee.

Earlier in his career, Smit-McPhee earned recognition as a child actor for his role in Romulus, My Father (2007). His performance in the film earned him nomination for a AACTA Award for Best Actor in a Leading Role. He later received nominations for various youth awards for his performances in Let Me In (2010) and The Road (2009).

In 2021, Smit-McPhee had a co-starring role in Jane Campion's drama film The Power of the Dog. His critically acclaimed performance in the film earned him the Golden Globe Award for Best Supporting Actor – Motion Picture, in addition to nominations for Academy Award for Best Supporting Actor, BAFTA Award for Best Actor in a Supporting Role, Critics' Choice Movie Award for Best Supporting Actor and Screen Actors Guild Award for Best Supporting Actor. His Oscar nomination made him the first blind person to be nominated for an Oscar in an acting category and the fourth Australian to be nominated in the category of Best Supporting Actor.

Major awards

Academy Awards

BAFTA Awards

Golden Globe Awards

Screen Actors Guild Awards

Critics' awards

Other awards

AACTA Awards

AACTA International Awards

Fangoria Chainsaw Awards

Satellite Awards

Saturn Awards

References

Smit-McPhee, Kodi